Triglochin bulbosa is a species of perennial herb in the family Juncaginaceae. They have a self-supporting growth form and simple, broad leaves. They are associated with freshwater habitat.

Sources

References 

Juncaginaceae
Flora of Malta